Breakenridge may refer to :

People
 Billy Breakenridge (1846–1931) American lawman, teamster, railroader, soldier and author in the American Old West
 David Breakenridge Read (1823–1904), Canadian lawyer and politician
Raymond Breakenridge (1897–1982), American rancher and politician

Places
Mount Breakenridge, 2,395 m (7,858 ft), is a mountain in the Lillooet Ranges of southwestern British Columbia.